Long Shadow is a three-part television documentary produced by ClearStory and presented by Cambridge University historian David Reynolds.  Each episode explores an enduring legacy of the First World War through the century that followed, tracing the impact on attitudes to war and peace, on politics and on nationalism. It premiered on BBC2 in September and October 2014, receiving widespread and favourable coverage in the press.

The series is based on David Reynolds’ book, The Long Shadow: the Great War and the Twentieth Century, published by Simon & Schuster in 2013, which won the 2014 PEN Hessell-Tiltman Prize for History.

References

External links

2014 British television series debuts
2014 British television series endings
BBC high definition shows
Documentary television series about World War I
BBC television documentaries about history during the 20th Century
British documentary television series
English-language television shows
BBC television documentaries about history during the 21st Century